Kim Jung-min (born 13 November 1999) is a South Korean footballer who plays as a midfielder for Anyang.

Career
On 27 July 2020, Kim joined Primeira Liga side Vitória de Guimarães on a four-year deal from Red Bull Salzburg.

On 10 January 2023, Kim signed with Anyang.

International career
Kim won the gold medal with the South Korea national under-23 football team at the 2018 Asian Games.

Career statistics

Club

Honours

International

South Korea U20
FIFA U-20 World Cup runner-up: 2019

South Korea U23
Asian Games: 2018

References

External links

1999 births
Sportspeople from Incheon
Living people
South Korean footballers
South Korea under-17 international footballers
South Korea under-20 international footballers
South Korea under-23 international footballers
South Korea international footballers
Association football midfielders
FC Liefering players
FC Admira Wacker Mödling players
Vitória S.C. players
Gangwon FC players
Busan IPark players
FC Anyang players
2. Liga (Austria) players
Austrian Football Bundesliga players
K League 2 players
Footballers at the 2018 Asian Games
Asian Games medalists in football
Asian Games gold medalists for South Korea
Medalists at the 2018 Asian Games
South Korean expatriate footballers
Expatriate footballers in Austria
South Korean expatriate sportspeople in Austria
Expatriate footballers in Portugal
South Korean expatriate sportspeople in Portugal